Patrician IV is the first computer game from Gaming Minds Studios and part of the Patrician series. It is a game simulating trading, piracy, politics and economics. An expansion pack, Rise of a Dynasty, was released in April 2011.

Originally the Patrician series was developed by Ascaron. Kalypso Media bought the licenses from the insolvent Ascaron company and formed Gaming Minds Studios.

Patrician IV was one of the launch games for OnLive.

References

External links
 Official website
 Developer website
 Patrician IV at MobyGames

2010 video games
Games for Windows certified games
Historical simulation games
MacOS games
Trade simulation games
Multiplayer and single-player video games
Video games developed in Germany
Video games set in the Middle Ages
Video games with expansion packs
Windows games
RuneSoft games